Jean-Pierre Weisgerber (28 March 1905 – 4 April 1994) was a Luxembourgian footballer. He competed at the 1924 Summer Olympics and the 1928 Summer Olympics.

References

External links

1905 births
1994 deaths
Luxembourgian footballers
Luxembourg international footballers
Olympic footballers of Luxembourg
Footballers at the 1924 Summer Olympics
Footballers at the 1928 Summer Olympics
Sportspeople from Esch-sur-Alzette
Association football forwards
CS Fola Esch players